Matthew Johnson-Roberson is an American roboticist, researcher, entrepreneur and educator. Since January 2022 he has served as director of the Robotics Institute at Carnegie Mellon University.  Previously he was a professor at the University of Michigan College of Engineering since 2013, where he co-directed the UM Ford Center for Autonomous Vehicles (FCAV) with Ram Vasudevan. His research focuses on computer vision and artificial intelligence, with the specific applications of autonomous underwater vehicles and self-driving cars. He is also the co-founder and CTO of Refraction AI, a company focused on providing autonomous last mile delivery.

Education 
Johnson-Roberson received his Bachelor's degree in computer science from Carnegie Mellon University in 2005 and his doctorate in robotics from the University of Sydney in 2010.

Career and research 
After completing his PhD, Johnson-Roberson held postdoctoral appointments at both the Australian Centre for Field Robotics and the Centre for Autonomous Systems (CAS) at KTH Royal Institute of Technology. Following his postdoctoral positions, he joined the University of Michigan College of Engineering in 2013 as a professor in the Naval Architecture and Marine Engineering department with a joint appointment in Computer Science and Engineering. Since January 2022 he serves as the sixth director of the Robotics Institute at Carnegie Mellon University.

Johnson-Roberson's research interests center around autonomous vehicles, including both underwater and ground vehicles. This focus leads to publications in Computer vision, Control theory and Artificial intelligence. At Michigan, Johnson-Roberson founded the DROP (Deep Robot Optical Perception) Lab, which conducts research to advance perception capabilities for autonomous systems operating in dynamic environments, especially in the areas of 3D reconstruction, segmentation, data mining, and visualization. This research aims to enable scientists to remotely access scientific sites through abstractions and reconstructions. Johnson-Roberson also co-directs the UM Ford Center for Autonomous Vehicles (FCAV), which researches technologies for autonomous driving.

In addition to his academic work, Johnson-Roberson also co-founded and serves as the CTO of Refraction AI, a start-up focused on providing autonomous last-mile delivery solutions. Refraction began a pilot delivery program with their REV-1 autonomous vehicle in Ann Arbor, Michigan in 2020 to deliver takeout and groceries.

Awards and honors 
Johnson-Roberson was a recipient of the NSF CAREER award in 2015 for work in 3D reconstruction in underwater environments with AUVs (Autonomous Underwater Vehicles).

Selected publications 
 J. Zhang, M. S. Ramanagopal, R. Vasudevan and M. Johnson-Roberson, "LiStereo: Generate Dense Depth Maps from LIDAR and Stereo Imagery," 2020 IEEE International Conference on Robotics and Automation (ICRA), Paris, France, 2020, pp. 7829-7836. https://doi.org/10.1109/ICRA40945.2020.9196628
 M. Yu, R. Vasudevan and M. Johnson-Roberson, "Occlusion-Aware Risk Assessment for Autonomous Driving in Urban Environments," in IEEE Robotics and Automation Letters, vol. 4, no. 2, pp. 2235-2241, April 2019. https://doi.org/10.1109/LRA.2019.2900453
 M. S. Ramanagopal, C. Anderson, R. Vasudevan and M. Johnson-Roberson, "Failing to Learn: Autonomously Identifying Perception Failures for Self-Driving Cars," in IEEE Robotics and Automation Letters, vol. 3, no. 4, pp. 3860-3867, Oct. 2018. https://doi.org/10.1109/LRA.2018.2857402

References

External links 

 

American roboticists
American computer scientists
Year of birth missing (living people)
University of Michigan faculty
Carnegie Mellon University faculty
Living people